Ruth Penington (1905–1998) was an American artist, jeweler and arts activist. 

Penington was born in Colorado Springs, Colorado and grew up in Seattle. She received an undergraduate degree, a Bachelor of Fine Arts, from the University of Washington in the 1927, followed by a Master of Fine Arts degree from Columbia University. Penington was instrumental in the founding of the Northwest Printmakers Society, the Northwest Designer Craftsmen, Friends of the Crafts in Seattle and the World Craft Council in New York City.

Her work is included in the collections of the Seattle Art Museum, and the Tacoma Art Museum.

References

1905 births
1998 deaths
20th-century American women artists
University of Washington alumni
Columbia University alumni